"It's a Wrap" is a song by American singer and songwriter Mariah Carey, from her twelfth studio album Memoirs of an Imperfect Angel (2009). The track was written solely by Carey, and was produced by Carey, Heatmyzer, Christopher "Tricky" Stewart and James "Big Jim" Wright. The lyrics revolve around the idea of "making sure a cheatin' ex knows it's over for good," and makes a reference to Maury Povich and his  show. It samples Love Unlimited's "I Belong to You" and interpolates Aretha Franklin's "Ain't No Way".

In 2023, the song became a viral TikTok dance, in which Carey subsequently released an EP for the song.

Background and release
"It's a Wrap" was written by Carey and produced by Carey, Heatmyzer, Christopher Stewart and James Wright. Carey discussed "It's a Wrap" on the Angels Advocate Tour in 2010 noting that it's "about relationships" and "like when you've waited all night long for somebody to come home and they finally come home, and it's the morning and you yourself are like, 'Where is this MF'er?'". She also teased a remix with singer Mary J. Blige.

"It's a Wrap" was released as the eighth track on Memoirs of an Imperfect Angel on September 29, 2009, and had a duration of 3 minutes and 59 seconds. In 2014, Carey announced that the previously scrapped remix featuring Blige would appear on her fourteenth studio album, Me. I Am Mariah... The Elusive Chanteuse, as a deluxe edition bonus track.

In 2023, “It's A Wrap” began to go viral on TikTok with a new Sped Up version of the song, a digital EP became available on February 10, 2023, including the new Sped Up version, the remix with Mary J. Blige and a previously-unreleased Edit version of the song.

Critical reception 
Upon the album's initial release in 2009, "It's a Wrap" garnered generally positive reviews from music critics. Mesfin Fekadu for the Associated Press wrote that the song "joins tracks like Vision of Love, Always Be My Baby and We Belong Together as a classic Mariah song". He also noted that "even though she's spitting venom, Carey's cooing on the doo-wop sounding song is so sensuous and sweet". Ty Jordan for GStyle Magazine praised "the getupouttamyhouse attitude of the song". In 2019, Asun for Insight praised Carey's "knowledge of music history" due to its samples and Aretha Franklin interpolation.

Remix 

In 2010, following the announcement of plans for the Angels Advocate Tour in support of Memoirs of an Imperfect Angel, Carey revealed that she was going to release a remix album, including new featured artists and songs from the album's recording sessions which did not make the final cut. American singer and songwriter Mary J. Blige was confirmed to be the featured artist on the remix of "It's a Wrap". The remix album, Angels Advocate, had been planned to be released in March 2010, but for unknown reasons was cancelled. The remix featuring Blige was included as a deluxe edition bonus track on her fourteenth studio album Me. I Am Mariah... The Elusive Chanteuse, which was released on May 27, 2014.

In popular culture 
In January 2023, the song became a viral TikTok challenge, which caused "the record to soar 1000% in weekly on-demand streams in the U.S. alone" and even prompted a response from Carey herself, with her video "amassing over 20 million plays on TikTok"." Several celebrities joined the challenge, including Kim Kardashian with her child North West.

Track listing
It's a Wrap EP
 "It's a Wrap" – 3:58
 "It's a Wrap (Sped Up)" – 2:44
 "It's a Wrap" (featuring Mary J. Blige) – 4:08
 "It's a Wrap (Edit)" – 3:01

Credits and personnel
Credits adapted from the liner notes of Memoirs of an Imperfect Angel.

Recording
Recorded at The Boom Boom Room, Burbank, California and Honeywest Studios, New York City.
Mixed at Larrabee Studios in Universal City, California.

Personnel
Songwriting – Mariah Carey and Barry White
Production – Mariah Carey, Heatmyzer, Christopher  "Tricky" Stewart and James "Big Jim" Wright
Recording – Brian Garten and Brian "B-Luv" Thomas
Recording assistant – Luis Navarro
Mixing – Jaycen-Joshua Fowler and Dave Pencado
Assistant mixing – Giancarlo Lino
Keys and Hammond B3 – "Big Jim", "Tricky" Stewart, Leon Bisquera and Monte Neuble

Charts

References

2009 songs
Mariah Carey songs
Song recordings produced by Tricky Stewart
Songs written by Mariah Carey
Songs written by Barry White